Rev. James Johnson (1674–1740) was an English author and cleric.

Born at Bowden Park, Wiltshire, Johnson was the son of George Johnson , judge and counsellor of Charles II. He took his B.A. at Hertford College, Oxford before taking his Master of Arts at Oriel College, Oxford in 1698. In 1701, he was presented by Sir John Cordell  as rector of Long Melford, Suffolk, where he remained until his death.

He married Anne Cuthbert, daughter of Thomas Cuthbert, of Wickford, Essex, and St. Andrew's, Holborn.

Johnson wrote The Great Duty, a meditation on 'the golden rule' in 1723. His son, James Johnson, became Bishop of Gloucester and Worcester.

The Rev. James Johnson died at Long Melford in 1740.

References
Transactions – Bristol and Gloucestershire Archaeological Society, (Volume 8), (1883)
Joseph Foster. Alumni Oxonienses, (Volume 2), (1891)
James Johnson. The Great Duty of Doing as We Would Be Done Unto, (1723)
William Parker. The History of Long Melford, (1873)

1674 births
1740 deaths
18th-century English writers
18th-century English male writers
18th-century English Anglican priests
Alumni of Hertford College, Oxford
Alumni of Oriel College, Oxford
People from Long Melford
17th-century Anglican theologians
18th-century Anglican theologians
Early modern Christian devotional writers